Richard Aboulafia is vice president of analysis at Teal Group and edits their World Military and Civil Aircraft Briefing, a forecasting tool. His job description includes "(managing) consulting projects in the commercial and military aircraft field and analyzes broader defense and aerospace trends."

He is a prominent aircraft industry analyst. He regularly appears on such media outlets as ABC, BBC, Bloomberg, Reuters, CBS, CNN, NBC, NPR and PBS. He is a Contributing Columnist at Aviation Week, and contributes to Forbes.

Career
Aboulafia earned a master's degree in War Studies from King's College, University of London and a bachelor's degree from George Washington University.
Before he began his tenure at Teal Group in 1990, Aboulafia worked at Jane's Information Group where he analyzed the jet engine market.

In 2002, Aboulafia co-authored with Aaron Gellman a Boeing funded report on the Airbus A380, released in 2004. Aboulafia was critical of the aircraft believing “the key to Airbus success in Paris (Air Show) is still the A350.”

Personal life
He is married to Casey and they have a son and a daughter.

References

External links
  Cites Aboulafia

Columbian College of Arts and Sciences alumni
Alumni of King's College London
American aviation writers
Living people
Aviation analysts
Year of birth missing (living people)